Frans Hogenberg (1535–1590) was a Flemish and German painter, engraver, and mapmaker.

Hogenberg was born in Mechelen in Flanders as the son of Nicolaas Hogenberg. In 1568 he was banned from Antwerp by the Duke of Alva because he was a protestant and had printed engravings sympathizing with the Beeldenstorm. He travelled to London, where he stayed a few years before emigrating to Cologne. He is known for portraits and topographical views as well as historical allegories. He also produced scenes of contemporary historical events.

Hogenberg died in Cologne.

Works

 Theatrum orbis terrarum - collaboration with Abraham Ortelius, 1565
 Civitates Orbis Terrarum - collaboration with his son Abraham and Georg Braun, 1572. This collection of maps across Europe is the most important book of town plans and views published in the 16th century. Hogenberg engraved the majority of the maps in the book and George Braun wrote the text and acquired source material for the books. There were six volumes of the book published.

Gallery

For other images see Commons.

References

See also
 Lambiek Comiclopedia article.
Frans Hogenberg in Dutch Wikipedia
 Junkersdorf Massacre (an incident outside Cologne that Hogenberg illustrated)
 Frans Hogenberg on Google Arts and Culture

1535 births
1590 deaths
Artists from Mechelen
German painters
German male painters
German engravers
Flemish engravers
16th-century Flemish painters
16th-century Flemish cartographers